Phyllis Else Maureen Perkins ( Green; 22 February 1934 – February 2023) was a British middle-distance runner. She competed in the women's 800 metres at the 1960 Summer Olympics. She also represented England in the 880 yards at the 1962 British Empire and Commonwealth Games in Perth, Australia.

Perkins died in February 2023, at the age of 89.

References

1934 births
2023 deaths
Athletes (track and field) at the 1960 Summer Olympics
British female middle-distance runners
Olympic athletes of Great Britain
Athletes (track and field) at the 1962 British Empire and Commonwealth Games
Commonwealth Games competitors for England
Sportspeople from Bristol
20th-century British people